is a railway station located in the city of Tome, Miyagi Prefecture, Japan operated by the East Japan Railway Company (JR East).

Lines
Mitakedō Station is served by the Kesennuma Line, and is located 13.6 rail kilometers from the terminus of the line at Maeyachi Station.

Station layout
The station has one side platform serving a single bi-directional track. The station is unattended.

History
Mitakedō Station opened on October 24, 1968. The station was absorbed into the JR East network upon the privatization of the Japan National Railways (JNR) on April 1, 1987.

Surrounding area
Kyūkitakami River (Old Kitakami River)

See also
 List of Railway Stations in Japan

External links

  
  video of a train trip from Yanaizu Station to Rikuzen-Toyosato Station in 2009, passing Mitakedō Station at around 03:35 minutes without stopping.

Railway stations in Miyagi Prefecture
Kesennuma Line
Railway stations in Japan opened in 1968
Tome, Miyagi
Stations of East Japan Railway Company